The Asian Para Games also known as Para Asiad is a multi-sport event regulated by the Asian Paralympic Committee that's held every four years after every Asian Games for athletes with physical disabilities. Both events had adopted the strategy used by the Olympic and Paralympic Games of having both games in the same city. However, the exclusion of Asian Para Games from Asian Games host city contract meant that both events run independently of each other. The Games are recognized by the International Paralympic Committee (IPC) and are described as the second largest multi-sport event after the Paralympic Games.

In its history, three nations have hosted the Asian Para Games and Forty-four nations have participated in the Games.

The most recent games was held in Jakarta, Indonesia from 6 to 13 October 2018. The next games are scheduled to Hangzhou, China between 9 and 15 October 2022.

History 

The FESPIC Games existed previous to the Asian Para Games and was contested by athletes from the Asia Pacific region. The FESPIC Games was first held in 1975 in Oita, Japan with 18 participating nations. Eight more FESPIC Games were held until 2006.

The Asian Para Games superseded the FESPIC Games, which was dissolved alongside the FESPIC Federation, the governing body of the games and merged with the Asian Paralympic Council which was renamed as the Asian Paralympic Committee at the closing of the final FESPIC edition held in November 2006 in Kuala Lumpur, Malaysia. The first Asian multi-sports event for athletes with a disability, the inaugural Asian Para Games was held in 2010 in Guangzhou, China.

List of Asian Para Games

Sports 

Twenty-four sports were presented in Asian Para Games history, including 2010 Games in Guangzhou.

Mascots 

The Asian Para Games mascots are fictional characters, usually an animal native to the area or human figures, who represent the cultural heritage of the place where the Asian Para Games are taking place. The mascots are often used to help market the Asian Para Games to a younger audience. Every Asian Para Games has its own mascot. Fun Fun, the mascot for the 2010 Asian Para Games was the first mascot.

Medal count 

Of the 44 National Paralympic Committees participating throughout the history of the Games, 37 nations have won at least a single medal in the competition, leaving 7 nations: Afghanistan, Bangladesh, Bhutan, Cambodia, Kyrgyzstan, Nepal and Tajikistan yet to win a single medal. 31 nations have won at least one gold medal and China became the only nation in history to emerge as overall champions.

Asian Youth Para Games

The Asian Youth Para Games is a multi-sport event held every four years for youth athletes with physical disabilities.  The first Games was held in 2009 in Tokyo, Japan. The Asian Youth Para Games superseded the FESPIC Youth Games which last held in 2003.

List of Youth Games

Youth Games Sports

  Archery (2013 only)
  Athletics (Since 2009)
  Badminton (since 2009)
  Boccia (since 2009)
  Bowling (2013 only)
  Chess (2013 only) 
  Goalball (since 2013)
  Judo (2013 only)
  Powerlifting (since 2013)
  Swimming (since 2009)
  Table tennis (since 2009)
  Taekwondo (2021 only)
  Sitting volleyball (2013 only)
  Wheelchair tennis (2013 only)
  Wheelchair basketball (2013,2021)

All-time Youth Games medal table (2009–2021)

See also
Asian Games
Paralympic Games
African Para Games
European Para Championships
Parapan American Games

References

External links 
 Asian Paralympic Committee

 
Disabled multi-sport events
Multi-sport events in Asia